Manihot carthaginensis subsp. glaziovii, also known as Manihot glaziovii, the tree cassava or Ceara rubber tree, is a species of deciduous flowering plant in the spurge family, Euphorbiaceae, that is native to eastern Brazil.

Description

Leaves - palmipartite, peltate; lobes broadly ovate to obovate; green above, glaucous beneath.
Flowers - show branched inflorescence. Unisexual flowers are greenish-white or pale yellow with reddish markings.
Fruit - globose.

Common names
French - manioc de ceara, maniçoba, ceara, caouchouc de ceara
Portuguese - maniçoba
Swahili - mpira 
Yoruba - gbaguda

Uses
The tree cassava was used a source of rubber, instead of Hevea brasiliensis throughout the world. The plant is introduced largely in the world, but now it is classified as one of the highly invasive plant of the world.

Scientists found various enzymatic and inhibitory activities of tree cassava, which have insecticidal and anti-fungal proteins extracted from the latex of the plant. These proteins are effective against insects such as cowpea weevil, and fungi like Colletotrichum gloesporioides, Fusarium solani and Macrophomina phaseolina.
It could be used as graft shoot in a rootstock of edible cassava and increase 10 times the yield per acre.

Invasiveness 
The species is invasive in New Caledonia.

References

Further reading
History of Manihot glaziovii
An acid phosphatase from Manihot glaziovii as an alternative to alkaline Phosphatase for molecular cloning experiments.
Characterisation and evaluation of a novel feedstock, Manihot glaziovii, Muell. Arg, for production of bioenergy carriers: Bioethanol and biogas.

Manihoteae
Flora of Brazil
Plant subspecies